Too Close to the Pole is an album by Bobby Previte's Weather Clear, Track Fast released on the Enja label in 1996.

Reception

The Allmusic site awarded the album 4 stars stating "it is the chance-taking spirit of the musicians and their performances as a whole that make this a memorable release well worth several listens".

Track listing
All compositions by Bobby Previte except where noted.
 "Too Close to the Pole" - 4:14
 "3 Minute Heels" - 13:00
 "The Countess' Bedroom: from the Opera "The Queen Of Spades"" (Pyotr Ilyich Tchaikovsky) - 8:22
 "Save the Cups" - 7:31
 "The Eleventh Hour" - 14:16
 "Too Close to the Pole" [Reprise] - 8:30
 "Untitled" - 16:02

Personnel
Bobby Previte – drums, voice
Lindsey Horner - electric bass, tin whistles, voice
Andy Laster - baritone saxophone, clarinet, flute, voice
Cuong Vu - trumpet, voice
Jamie Saft - piano, Fender Rhodes piano, Hammond organ, clavinet, voice
Curtis Hasselbring - trombone, voice
Andrew D'Angelo - alto saxophone, bass clarinet, voice

References 

Bobby Previte albums
Enja Records albums
1996 albums